The Aramia River is a river in southwestern Papua New Guinea.

See also
List of rivers of Papua New Guinea
Aramia River languages (Gogodala–Suki languages)

References

Rivers of Papua New Guinea